Alastair Patrick Johnstone Monteath (12 September 1913 – 27 June 1942) was a New Zealand cricketer. He played two first-class matches for Otago in 1939/40. He was killed in action during World War II.

See also
 List of Otago representative cricketers
 List of cricketers who were killed during military service

References

External links
 

1913 births
1942 deaths
New Zealand cricketers
Otago cricketers
Cricketers from Christchurch
New Zealand military personnel killed in World War II